The King of the Turf is a 1926 American drama film directed by James P. Hogan and written by John C. Brownell, Louis Joseph Vance and J. Grubb Alexander. The film stars George Irving, Patsy Ruth Miller, Kenneth Harlan, Alan Roscoe, Kathleen Kirkham and Mary Carr. The film was produced by Robertson-Cole Pictures Corporation and released on February 28, 1926, by Film Booking Offices of America.

Cast       
George Irving as Colonel Fairfax
Patsy Ruth Miller as Kate Fairfax
Kenneth Harlan as John Doe Smith
Alan Roscoe as Tom Selsby 
Kathleen Kirkham as Letitia Selsby
Mary Carr as Martha Fairfax
David Torrence as Martyn Selsby
David Kirby as Red Kelly 
Billy Franey as Soup Conley 
Eddie Phillips as Dude Morlanti

References

External links
 

1926 films
1920s English-language films
Silent American drama films
1926 drama films
Film Booking Offices of America films
Films directed by James Patrick Hogan
American silent feature films
American black-and-white films
1920s American films